Toni Young (born January 11, 1991) is an American professional basketball player who last played for the New York Liberty of the WNBA.

College
While Young was in college she was motivated by her head coach Kurt Budke and assistant coach Miranda Serna of Oklahoma State Cowgirls basketball team Young's first two years. They would tell Young that if she uses all of her potential she can make it into the WNBA.

Oklahoma  State statistics
Source

WNBA
Young was selected seventh by the New York Liberty in the 2013 WNBA Draft. She became the second women's player from Oklahoma State to get picked in an WNBA Draft.

On March 2, 2015 Young signed with the San Antonio Stars.

References

External links
Oklahoma State Cowgirls bio

1991 births
Living people
American women's basketball players
Basketball players from Oklahoma
New York Liberty draft picks
New York Liberty players
Oklahoma State Cowgirls basketball players
Forwards (basketball)